Crooksville High School is a public high school in Crooksville, Ohio.  It is the only high school in the Crooksville Exempted Village School District.  Their nickname is the Ceramics. The high school was built in 1988.

Ohio High School Athletic Association State Championships

Crooksville participates in the Muskingum Valley League.

State championships
 Boys Football – 1977 and 1963

References

External links
 District Website

High schools in Perry County, Ohio
Public high schools in Ohio